Garrett Limbrick (born November 6, 1965) is a former American football running back. He played for the Miami Dolphins in 1990.

References

1965 births
Living people
American football running backs
Oklahoma State Cowboys football players
Miami Dolphins players